Allison Maslan is an American entrepreneur, business mentor, homeopath, and author. She is the executive producer and host of her online television show, Allie & You.

Early career and education
Maslan grew up in Tulsa, Oklahoma, and attended Arizona State University, where she studied journalism. When she was 19, she began a small business in writing personalized poetry during college. In 1981, Maslan went on to build her own full service advertising and public relations firm. In 1996, she completed a Phd program in Homeopathy from the British Institute of Homeopathy. In 1997, she completed a Holistic Health Practitioner Program in Counseling at the Body Mind College and received her Certification as a Classical Homeopath.

Career
In 1996, Maslan became an expert practitioner and CEO of the Homeopathy Wellness Center. In 1999, she built the Homeopathic Academy of Southern California, which is a premiere college for homeopathy.
Maslan has built a number of companies ranging from a full service advertising and public relations firm, a scuba diving certification program, a real estate investment company, a beauty salon, and a jewelry and accessory company. Maslan is the CEO of Blast Off! A Business Mentoring Company. She is the Executive Producer and host of her own weekly online television show, Allie & You.

Awards and publications
Self Made magazine listed Allison Maslan on its list of " 50 Women Entrepreneurs Who Inspire Us".
In 2010, Morgan James Publishing published Maslan's book, "Blast Off! The Surefire Success Plan to Launch Your Dreams Into Reality".

References

External links
 Official website

Year of birth missing (living people)
Living people
Businesspeople from Tulsa, Oklahoma
Walter Cronkite School of Journalism and Mass Communication alumni
Writers from Tulsa, Oklahoma